Vancouver Sessions (sometimes spelled as "The Vancouver Sessions" or simply "Vancouver Session") is the epithet of a set of acoustic studio recordings made by Canadian-American singer Alanis Morissette.

Recorded in 2003, prior to the release of the album So-Called Chaos, some tracks from Vancouver Sessions were released as b-sides of the singles from that album. The officially released tracks are:

 Precious Illusions (as a b-side of Everything single);
 So Unsexy (as a b-side of Everything single);
 Everything (as a b-side of Everything single);
 Spineless (as a b-side of Out Is Through single);
 Eight Easy Steps (as a b-side of Out is Through single);
 This Grudge (as b-side of Out is Through single).
 Still (track 5 on the Download to Donate for Haiti album)

Files of the following tracks claimed as versions of "Vancouver Sessions" are easily found on the Internet:

 A Man;
 Excuses;
 Sister Blister;
 Out is Through;
 So-called chaos;
 Head over Feet (which is actually a version of iTunes Originals - Alanis Morissette);
 Thank U (even though in the zipped files which claim to contain all the tracks, that is considered a “missing track”. In other words, the text files contained in those zipped folders describe "Thank U" as the 6th track of the "album", however, there is no such related audio file with it);
 A remixed version of So Unsexy.
Knees Of My Bees - there are rumours that this song was included, however no such file has surfaced

Alanis Morissette albums